Ahmet Mümtaz Taylan (born 12 September 1965) is a Turkish film, television and theatre actor and director.

Biography 
Taylan graduated in theatre from Hacettepe University State Conservatory. He is best known for his role as İskender in the hit surreal comedy series Leyla ile Mecnun and other films.

Between 1989 and 1993, he worked at the Diyarbakır State Theatre. In 1993 and 1994, he worked with Roberto Ciulli at the Theatre an Der Ruhr in Germany. Taylan has since worked in many theatrical projects with Yücel Erten. He became General Secretary of the Devlet Tiyatroları Sanatçıları Derneği or DETİS (State Theatre Artists' Association) and served in the position until he resigned in 2006. In 2002, he won the İsmet Küntay award for Best Director for the play Misafir Sahneleyişi.

Filmography 

Yaşamak Bu Değil (1981)
Gazino Bülbülü (1985) 	
Çifte Vakkas (1993)
İstanbul Kanatlarımın Altında (1996) 	
Yılan Hikayesi (1999)
Baba (1999)
Barbunya Nuri (2000)	
Zeybek Ateşi (2002)
Kumsaldaki İzler (2002)
Baba (2003)
Kurşun Yarası (2003)
Okul (2003)
İnşaat (2003)
Yazı Tura (2003)
Çaylak (2003)
Kayıp Aşklar (2004)
Anlat İstanbul (2004)
Sahra (2004)
Hırsız Var! (2004)
Arapsaçı (2004) 	
Galatasaray - Depor (2005)
Çapkın (2005)
Cenneti Beklerken (2005)
Şaşkın (2005)
Sen Ne Dilersen (2005)
Kınalı Kuzular: Nişanlıya Verilen Söz (2006)
Emret Komutanım: Şah Mat (2006)
Daha Neler (2006)
Eve Dönüş (2006)
Ezo Gelin (2006)
Made in Europe (2007)
Bayrampaşa: Ben Fazla Kalmayacağım (2007)
Hayat Apartmanı (2007)
Zeynep'in Sekiz Günü (2007)
Başımın Belası (2007)
Geçerken Uğradım (2007) 	
Mavi Gözlü Dev (2007)
Kars Hikayeleri (2008)
Anında Görüntü Show (2008)	
Kadri'nin Götürdüğü Yere Git (2009)
Gölgesizler (2008)
Son Bahar (2008)
Kaptan Feza (2009)
Sonsuz (2009)
Adını Sen Koy (2009)
Ejder Kapanı (2010)
Saklı Hayatlar (2010)
Ateşe Yürümek (2010)
Ben Hatice (2011) 	
Leyla ile Mecnun (2011)
Bir Zamanlar Anadolu'da (2011)
Kurtuluş Son Durak (2012)
The Butterfly's Dream (2013)
Güzel Köylü (2014-2015)
Hayat Şarkısı (2016–2017)
Hayat Sırları (2017)
Ölümlü Dünya (2018)
İnsanlık Suçu (2018)
Halka (2019)
Organize İşler Sazan Sarmalı (2019)
Alef (2020)
Arıza (2020–2021)
Ölüm Zamanı (2021)
Kin (2021)
Aziz (2021)

References

External links
 
 

1965 births
Living people
Male actors from Ankara
Turkish male film actors
Turkish male stage actors
Turkish male television actors
Turkish theatre directors
Hacettepe University alumni